Vincenzo Blo (12 March 1888 – 5 July 1967) was an Italian gymnast. He competed in the men's team event at the 1908 Summer Olympics.

References

1888 births
1967 deaths
Italian male artistic gymnasts
Olympic gymnasts of Italy
Gymnasts at the 1908 Summer Olympics
Sportspeople from Ferrara